Bamberg City Hall, located in Bamberg, South Carolina is a municipal city hall.  It is an example of the type of early twentieth-century style of governmental building designed by the Anderson, South Carolina firm of Sayre and Baldwin.  A number of architectural details of this three-story brick and cast stone building are also noteworthy.  The building was listed in the National Register of Historic Places on September 28, 2004.

References

External links

City and town halls on the National Register of Historic Places in South Carolina
Neoclassical architecture in South Carolina
Government buildings completed in 1909
Buildings and structures in Bamberg County, South Carolina
National Register of Historic Places in Bamberg County, South Carolina
City and town halls in South Carolina